Wanderson de Oliveira (born 26 March 1997) is a Brazilian boxer. He competed in the men's lightweight event at the 2020 Summer Olympics.

References

External links

1997 births
Living people
Brazilian male boxers
Olympic boxers of Brazil
Boxers at the 2020 Summer Olympics
Place of birth missing (living people)
South American Games medalists in boxing
South American Games gold medalists for Brazil
Competitors at the 2018 South American Games
Sportspeople from Rio de Janeiro (city)
20th-century Brazilian people
21st-century Brazilian people